The men's 5000 metres in speed skating at the 1980 Winter Olympics took place on 16 February, at the James B. Sheffield Olympic Skating Rink.

Records
Prior to this competition, the existing world and Olympic records were as follows:

The following new Olympic records was set.

Results

References

Men's speed skating at the 1980 Winter Olympics